Hawksworth Restaurant, located in the Rosewood Hotel Georgia in Vancouver, British Columbia, is a fine-dining restaurant owned by chef David Hawksworth, the youngest chef to be inducted into the B.C. Restaurant Hall of Fame.  The restaurant was named, "Restaurant of the Year" in 2012 by Maclean's.

References

External links
 

Restaurants in Vancouver
Fine dining